Alfonso Barasoain Carrillero (28 January 1958 – 25 May 2021) was a Spanish football manager and former player who played as a midfielder.

References

External links

1958 births
2021 deaths
People from Mungialdea
Spanish footballers
Association football midfielders
Gernika Club footballers
Spanish football managers
Segunda División managers
SD Amorebieta managers
Barakaldo CF managers
SD Eibar managers
Palamós CF managers
CD Eldense managers
Sestao River managers
SD Lemona managers
Sportspeople from Biscay
Footballers from the Basque Country (autonomous community)